Thoresby Colliery was a coal mine in north Nottinghamshire on the outskirts of Edwinstowe village. The mine, which opened in 1925, was the last working colliery in Nottinghamshire when it closed in 2015. The site has been cleared and it being redeveloped as a housing estate.

History
Thoresby colliery opened in 1925.

After privatisation of the National Coal Board in the 1990s the mine was taken over by RJB Mining (later UK Coal as UK Coal Thoresby Ltd).

Coal seams worked by, or available to, the pit included the Top Hard seam, the Parkgate seam (after closure of Ollerton Colliery in 1994); the Deep Soft seam; and the High Hazels seam (working ceased 1983).

In April 2014 it was announced that the pit would close by July 2015. The colliery's 600 employees had been reduced to 360 by the time of the closure in July 2015. At the time of closure, Thoresby was one of the two last remaining deep-mined coal sources owned by UK Coal, together with Kellingley which closed soon after.

In 2015, the Thoresby Colliery Benevolent Fund, established in 1951, was wound up with £56,000 surplus which was distributed to five different local charities.

Redevelopment
The site is being reclaimed and redeveloped with a ten-year plan into housing and associated infrastructure, named Thoresby Vale, Edwinstowe. Initial plans were to include a country park and with five acres set aside for a primary school. Local MP Mark Spencer mentioned that provision was also needed for a doctors' surgery, and hoped that section 106 monies could be used to upgrade the nearby traffic island and establish a passenger rail service extension to the Robin Hood Line.

References

External links
 UK Coal

1925 establishments in England
2015 disestablishments in England
Coal mines in Nottinghamshire
Underground mines in England
Edwinstowe